Tomáš Bruško (born 21 February 1983) is a Slovak former professional footballer who played as a midfielder.

It was announced that Tomáš would play for Leeds United against MFK Ruzomberok in a pre-season friendly match with the Yorkshire club exploring the possibility of signing the midfielder.

Honours

Slovakia
Slovakia U20
2003 FIFA U-20 World Cup: Participation

Slovakia U19
 2002 UEFA European Under-19 Football Championship - Third place

References

External links 

1983 births
Living people
People from Myjava
Sportspeople from the Trenčín Region
Association football midfielders
Slovak footballers
Slovakia youth international footballers
Slovak expatriate footballers
Spartak Myjava players
FK Dubnica players
1. FC Union Berlin players
FK Dukla Banská Bystrica players
FC Dynamo-2 Kyiv players
FC Dynamo-3 Kyiv players
ŠK Slovan Bratislava players
FC Vorskla Poltava players
Slovak Super Liga players
Ukrainian Premier League players
Expatriate footballers in Ukraine